David Murphy is an Irish writer, born in Cork in 1953.

Career
He graduated from UCC (1974) with a degree in Irish, Welsh & European History. In 1976, after a couple of years travelling and working odd jobs, he moved to the Dublin area to begin a teaching career in which he remained until 2003 when he took early retirement to concentrate on writing full time. Since then he has had six titles published. His most recent book is a debut poetry collection, Drowning in the Desert, published by Limerick's Revival Press in 2020.
Walking on Ripples – his first book to feature non-fiction – was published by Dublin's Liffey Press in 2014. Previous work includes a contemporary fantasy novella Bird of Prey (2011), Arkon Chronicles (also a novella, 2003) and the well received novel Longevity City (2005), each of which was published in the USA.

His award-winning short fiction has been published and translated worldwide; over one hundred appearances including magazines and anthologies, two chapbooks (1995 and 1998) and a short story collection brought out in Dublin in 2004 and since reprinted. The title story of that collection, Lost Notes, won the inaugural Maurice Walsh Award for short stories. He has also been short-listed for the Molly Keane and Aisling Gheal awards.
His poetry is also award-winning, for instance Dublin’s Red Line Book Festival 2018.

He has given readings of his own work, as well as talks (on the history of ‘imaginative’ fiction in the Irish tradition) at bookshops, arts festivals and other events including the Frank O’Connor Festival in Cork, Limerick’s ‘On the Nail’, Waterford Writers’ Weekend, Chapter’s Lunchtime Series, West Cork Literary Festival, Irish Writers’ Centre, Imagine, Shorelines, Culture Night, Poetry Day and various other arts & literature events in Ireland (Ballymaloe,  Boyle, Greystones, Trim, Strokestown, Mountshannon) and abroad (Bradford, Copenhagen, Montreal).

He has been interviewed in print, online, and on RTE, Lyric FM, WLR, LMFM as well as Kerry and Limerick radio. David Murphy’s books have received many favourable reviews, all of which are available online on the website to which he also contributes various book and film reviews (see official website below).
A founder editor of Albedo One Magazine and co-ordinator of the Aeon Award for short stories, though he has stepped down from those positions to concentrate on writing.
He has lived in North County Dublin for over forty years, though in recent times he can often be found in County Waterford.

Quotes

"Lost Notes" is a story that approaches greatness. Attempts at description can only diminish it. There are certain passages in great music that, whenever I hear them, I have only to close my eyes to be released from corporeality. "Lost Notes" had the same effect on me." - Dr David Marcus

"It's a rare talent who can show a glimpse of what Ireland is and could become. David Murphy doesn't believe in glimpses. He shows it all, every subtle distinction, every smell, every shade. You will remember this book." - Roelof Goudriaan (on the stories in LOST NOTES).

"One of the most exciting writers exploring the boundaries of the modern short story in Ireland today." - Robert Neilson

The Irish Times described Walking on Ripples as follows: "The latest entry in the well-stocked category of fishing books in the great literary or romantic tradition - reflective, speculative, full of allegory, memory and metaphor" and "Walking on Ripples is that rare creature: a fiction-memoir, a daring blend of fact and award-winning invention, a hybrid rarely seen and seldom caught."

References

External links
 Official Website
 An Interview with DM
 Irish Writers Online
 Munster Literature Centre

Year of birth missing (living people)
Living people
Irish writers